Rail service in Namibia is provided by TransNamib. The Namibian rail network consists of 2,687 route-km of tracks (2017).

Namibia has a history of more than 100 years of railway service. During the colonialisation by the German Empire between 1894 and 1915, a number of railways were built, of which some are still in service today.

History

Early development 
The building of German South West Africa railways began with a small mining rail line at Cape Cross in 1895. The first major railway project was started in 1897 when the German Colonial Authority built the "Staatsbahn" (state railway) from Swakopmund to Windhoek. By 1902 the line was completed. Parallel to this government initiative the Otavi Mining and Railway Company (O.M.E.G.) was established which built a line from Swakopmund to Tsumeb via Otavi between 1903 and 1906, and a branch from Otavi to Grootfontein in 1907/08.

In 1914 the following railway lines existed:
The Cape Cross line, 2 feet 6 inch gauge; 13 miles long, built by George Gale, General Foreman in the Harbour Department at Durban using 18 lbs per yard rails
The German State Railways, 3 feet 6 inch gauge; 870 miles long
The German State Railways, 2  feet gauge; 120 miles long
The Otavi Railway, 2 feet gauge; 418 miles long
The Walvis Bay Railway, 2 feet 6  inches gauge; about 11 miles long
Several other 2 feet gauge branch lines to mines at Khan, Kalkfelt and Outjo<ref>A.J. Beaton: [https://hdl.handle.net/10520/AJA10212019_15119 Notes on railway construction during the 1914-15 campaign in German South-West Africa.] Civil Engineering (Siviele Ingenieurswese), Vol 1916, No 1.</ref>

The German colonial railway was taken over by the Railways of South Africa after World War I, and linked into the network of South Africa.

African Rail Conference
Plans to integrate the railways of Africa to facilitate trade were discussed at the Africa Rail conference in Johannesburg, South Africa in August 2002. The move forms part of the New Partnership for Africa's Development (NEPAD), a programme aimed at economic renaissance.

The railways were built by former colonial powers, but were not built to advance African interests. Plans were put into place to link the three parallel east-west lines in Angola and to connect the Angolan network to that of Namibia and hence to South Africa.

The strategic positioning of Maputo rail and port infrastructure indicated that the network should be promoted as the primary corridor serving Zimbabwe, Zambia, Democratic Republic of Congo, Eswatini, and South Africa's Mpumalanga province.

South Africa's transport minister, Abdulah Omar, said Africa needed to integrate its railway systems to form an internationally-competitive network.  Experts said this could involve leasing locomotives and wagons, becoming involved as concessionaires and consultants, and participating in joint ventures.

Current Railway Lines

Windhoek-Kranzberg
 Windhoek - capital - junction
 Okahandja 
 Karibib - proposed cement works
 Kranzberg - junction Tsumeb v Windhoek.

Kranzberg-Walvis Bay
The section between Kranzberg and Swakopmund was completed in 1902. In 1914 an extension to Walvis Bay was commissioned; the rails were laid close to the shore of the Atlantic Ocean. In 1980 this extension was replaced by an alternative route behind the dunes that allowed for higher axle load.
 Kranzberg - junction Tsumeb v Windhoek.
 Usakos
 Arandis - crossing loop
 Swakopmund
 Walvis Bay - port

Kranzberg-Otavi
 Kranzberg - junction Tsumeb v Windhoek.
 Omaruru
 Kalkfeld - short siding
 Otjiwarongo - junction for Outjo
 Otavi

Otavi-Grootfontein
 Otavi - junction for Grootfontein
 Grootfontein - branch terminus.

Seeheim-Aus
The connection between Lüderitz and Aus was completed in 1906, and the extension to Seeheim was completed in 1908. The service between Aus and Lüderitz was decommissioned in 1997, due to poor track condition, and there is no regular passenger service between Seeheim and Aus.

The line to Lüderitz was rehabilitated in the 2010s and was scheduled for reopening in 2017. Test trains ran to Lüderitz in 2014 and Lüderitz Harbour in 2018.
 

Nakop-Windhoek
The section between Karasburg and Keetmanshoop was completed in 1909. In 1912 the  connection between Karasburg and Windhoek was completed, and the extension to Upington (South Africa) was built in 1915.
  Upington
   Nakop border
 Karasburg
 Keetmanshoop
 Tses 
 Rehoboth 
 Windhoek - capital - junction

Otjiwarongo-Outjo
The first  were completed under the German colonial administration in 1914/1915; the railway line was named Amboland Railway in reference to the territory of the Ovambo people. The link to Outjo was completed in 1921 under South African rule.
 Otjiwarongo - junction for Outjo
 Outjo - railhead

Windhoek-Gobabis

 Windhoek - capital - junction
 Neudamm 
 Omitara 
 Gobabis - branch railhead

Otavi-Oshikango
In 2005, an 89 km section of new Northern Railway from Tsumeb to Oshivelo was opened by President Sam Nujoma, as part of the "Northern Extension" of the railway link from Kranzberg to Otavi. Construction on the project's second phase, a 59 km stretch from Ondangwa to Oshikango on the Angolan border at a cost of about N$329m, was scheduled to be completed by December 2007. Ondangwa Station opened in 2006 for freight.

In phase 3, a 58 km branch from Ondangwa to Oshakati was constructed at an estimated cost of N$220m, for completion in December 2008. For the future a connection from Oshikango to a point near Cassinga is planned on Angola's  southern railway system.

The Ondangwa-Oshikango line was officially opened by President Hifikepunye Pohamba in July 2012. In order to keep system operational and safe, provincial governor Usko Nghaamwa implored local residents to stop stealing railroad ties and sections of the wire fence.
 Otavi - junction for Grootfontein
 Tsumeb 
 Ondangwa - junction
 Oniipa road bridge.
 Onjdiva
 Namacunde
 Oshakati 
   Oshikango - border post - current railhead

Historic Railway Lines
Apart from a number of short rail connections built by mining companies, the following railway links are decommissioned:

  Cape Cross Mine Railway,  gauge. The first railway line in South West Africa, built in 1895/96.
  Walvis Bay Railway,  gauge, completed in 1899. The line linked the port of Walvis Bay to Rooikop.
  Otavibahn, a  private railway built by the Otavi Mining and Railway Company between 1903 and 1906 to connect the mines at Tsumeb to the town of Swakopmund. The Otavibahn was the longest  gauge railway in the world at its time of construction.
  a  industrial line linking Kolmanskop with Bogenfels, completed 1913. This was the only rail link in Namibia ever electrified. The rail track does not exist anymore.
  Amboland Railway'', Otjiwarongo - Outjo, 1914-1915.

Proposed Railway Lines

Trans-Kalahari Coal Line 
 Gobabis - current railhead
   Buitepos - border post
  Mamuno
  Mmamabula - coal deposits
  Lobatse, Botswana  - current railhead

Zambia-Namibia link 

 Zambia - Grootfontein

Recommissioning of the Aus-Lüderitz Line
The railway to Lüderitz is now complete and is now being evaluated for freight traffic use. The first test train to Luderitz Via Aus arrived on October 10, 2018. According to the Karas Region Chancellor Jan Scholtz, Passenger service to Luderitz will commence once it is determined that there is sufficient demand for it, but for the time being it is not being considered.

 Aus
 Grasplatz
 Lüderitz - port

See also 

 Transport in Namibia
 Railway stations in Namibia

References

External links

TransNamib website
Namibweb.com: First railway lines in Namibia